Lasianthus oliganthus is a species of plant in the family Rubiaceae. It is endemic to Sri Lanka.

Leaves
Acute to obtuse base, pointed apex, 4-5 lateral veins.

Trunk
Branches slender, slightly rough, adpressed hairs.

Flowers
Very small, sessile, solitary, or 2 or 3.

Fruits
Very small, depressed berry, truncate at top.

Ecology
Rain forest understory of wet zone.

References

Flora of Sri Lanka
oliganthus
Conservation dependent plants
Taxonomy articles created by Polbot